Gun Lake may refer to:

Gun Lake (Michigan), in Barry and Allegan counties
Gun Lake (Mason County, Michigan)
Gun Lake (British Columbia), Canada, also known as Big Gun Lake and formerly spelled Gunn Lake.
Lajoie Lake, near Gun Lake, British Columbia, is also known as Little Gun Lake.  The two together are referred to as the Gun Lakes.